Hoseynabad-e Jarandaq (also Romanized as Ḩoseynābād-e Jarandaq and Ḩoseynābād Jarandaq; also known as Ḩoseynābād-e Do Dāngeh, Guseynabad, Ḩoseynābād, and Husainābād) is a village in Dodangeh-ye Olya Rural District, Ziaabad District, Takestan County, Qazvin Province, Iran. At the 2006 census, its population was 181, in 57 families.

References 

Populated places in Takestan County